The British Virgin Islands has competed at every edition of the Pan American Games since the ninth edition of the multi-sport event in 1983. The British Virgin Islands did not compete at the first and only Pan American Winter Games in 1990.

The British Virgin Islands won its first ever gold medal and its first ever Pan American Games  medal after Chantel Malone won the women's long jump track and field event at the 2019 Pan American Games in Lima, Peru.

Medal count 

To sort the tables by host city, total medal count, or any other column, click on the  icon next to the column title.

Summer

Winter

Medals by sport

References